Willowdale Township may refer to one of the following places in the United States:

 Willowdale Township, Dickinson County, Kansas
 Willowdale Township, Holt County, Nebraska

See also

Willowdale (disambiguation)
Willow Township (disambiguation)

Township name disambiguation pages